The British 5,000 metres athletics champions covers four competitions; the current British Athletics Championships which was founded in 2007, the preceding AAA Championships (1880-2006), the Amateur Athletic Club Championships (1866-1879) and finally the UK Athletics Championships which existed from 1977 until 1997 and ran concurrently with the AAA Championships. The distance was originally 4 miles but in 1932 switched to 3 miles. 

Where an international athlete won the AAA Championships the highest ranking UK athlete is considered the National Champion in this list.

Past winners

 nc = not contested
 + = UK Championships

References

5,000 metres
British
British Athletics Championships